Wolf and Sheep is a 2016 Danish-Afghan drama film directed by Shahrbanoo Sadat. It was screened in the Directors' Fortnight section at the 2016 Cannes Film Festival where it won the Art Cinema Award. It is the first installment in a planned pentalogy based on the unpublished diaries of Anwar Hashimi. Its sequel, The Orphanage, came out in 2019.

Reception
On review aggregator website Rotten Tomatoes, Wolf and Sheep has an approval rating of 100% based on 5 reviews, with an average rating of 8.50/10.

References

External links

2016 films
2016 drama films
Danish drama films
Dari-language films
Afghan drama films